El Feidh is a town and commune in Biskra Province, Algeria. According to the 1998 census it has a population of 12,482.

References

External links
 

Communes of Biskra Province
Biskra Province